The discography of Christian rock and modern worship band David Crowder Band consists of six studio albums, three extended plays (EPs), one compilation albums, two live albums, one holiday album and sixteen singles.

Discography

Independent albums
 1998 - Pour Over Me, no-label
 1999 - All I Can Say, no-label

Studio albums

Live albums

Independent Live albums
 2002 - The Green CD, no-label
 2003 - The Yellow CD, no-label

Compilation albums

Holiday albums

EPs

Singles

Other charted songs

Music videos

References

Discographies of American artists
Christian music discographies
Rock music group discographies